William Handcock (c. 1631 – c. 1 July 1707) was an Irish politician.

Life
Originally from Lancashire, son of  Christopher  Handcock and Mary Browne, Handcock entered the Irish House of Commons in 1661, holding his seat for Westmeath until 1666. He was then appointed to the Council of the Lord President of Connaught and in 1680, he received a grant to erect a manor in Twyford, County Westmeath. Handcock represented Athlone in the Commons from 1692 until 1699 and sat in the following parliament again for Westmeath from 1703 until his death in 1707.

Personal life
On 25 July 1652, he married Abigail Stanley, daughter of Sir Thomas Stanley and Mary Hammond, and sister of the writer Thomas Stanley. They had eight children. His sons William and Thomas sat also in the Parliament of Ireland.  Two other sons, Matthew and Stephen, were senior Church of Ireland clergymen. One of their daughters Hannah married the leading politician and judge Robert Rochfort: their descendants held the title Earl of Belvedere. Her sister Sarah married Captain Chichester Phillips of Drumcondra Castle, MP for Askeaton. A third daughter Elizabeth married Duke Gifford of Castlejordan, County Meath. Duke was the heir, most likely the nephew, of Sir Thomas Gifford, first and last of the Gifford baronets.

References

1640s births
1707 deaths
High Sheriffs of County Westmeath
Members of the Parliament of Ireland (pre-1801) for Athlone
Members of the Parliament of Ireland (pre-1801) for County Westmeath constituencies
Irish MPs 1661–1666
Irish MPs 1692–1693
Irish MPs 1695–1699
Irish MPs 1703–1713